{{Infobox nobility
| name              =José Álvarez de Toledo
| title             = Duke of Alba, Marquess of Villafranca (etc...)
| image             =Portrait of Jose Alvarez de Toledo, Duke of Alba and Marquess of Villafranca, c. 1795, by Goya - Art Institute of Chicago - DSC09509.JPG
| caption           =The Duke of Alba by Francisco de Goya, 1795
| spouse            =María del Pilar Teresa Cayetana de Silva Alvarez de Toledo, 13th Duchess of Alba
| issue             =María de la Luz (Adopted)
| full name         =José María del Carmen Francisco Manuel Joaquín Pedro Juan Andrés Avelino Cayetano Venancio Francisco de Paula Gonzaga Javier Ramón Blas Tadeo Vicente Sebastián Rafael Melchior Gaspar Baltasar Luis Pedro de Alcántara Buenaventura Diego Andrés Apostol Isidro 
| noble family      = House of Toledo
| father            = 
| mother            =
| brother           =
| birth_date        =
| birth_place       =Madrid, Spain
| death_date        =
| death_place       =Seville, Andalusia, Spain
| signature        = 
}}
Don José Álvarez de Toledo Osorio y Gonzaga, 11th Marquess of Villafranca, Grandee of Spain, jure uxoris Duke of Alba de Tormes, Grandee of Spain (16 July 1756 – 9 June 1796) was a patron of the artist Francisco Goya.

Biography
Álvarez de Toledo was born in 1756 in Madrid. He became chamberlain, at thirteen, to King Charles IV of Spain. He, originally Marquess of Villafranca, married his kinswoman Doña María del Pilar Teresa Cayetana de Silva y Álvarez de Toledo, 13th Duchess of Alba, who was the legendary "Duchess of Alba" in Goya's paintings, thus becoming de jure uxoris'' Duke of Alba. Their marriage made them the wealthiest couple in the kingdom; they competed against the Osuna family. A year after his marriage, he inherited the dukedom of Medina-Sidonia (by the 21st century the oldest extant dukedom in the kingdom) and joined two of the most important Houses of the Spanish nobility.

The failed attempt of his friend Alejandro Malaspina to oust Queen María Luisa's favourite Manuel de Godoy in favour of the Duke of Alba put an early end to the political career of the progressive aristocrat.

Álvarez de Toledo y Gonzaga died on 9 June 1796, in Seville.

In a famous portrait by Goya, the duke is clad in elegant riding clothes. With an air of melancholy he looks up from the music book he is holding in his hands, including the "Four songs/with piano accompaniment/by Mr. Haydn". The duke commissioned several works from Joseph Haydn and was a gifted musician himself. In his painting, Goya subtly combines the symbols of his model's passion for music and equestrian skills (viola or violin, riding boots and riding hat) with the neoclassical interior of the ducal residence.

Ancestry

|-

|-

|-

1756 births
1796 deaths
115
108
Jose Maria
Jose Maria
Jose Maria
18th-century Spanish nobility
Marquesses of Los Vélez
Grandees of Spain
Knights of the Golden Fleece of Spain
Marquesses of Molina